The 2017 Melbourne Darts Masters was the inaugural staging of the tournament by the Professional Darts Corporation, as a fifth entry in the 2017 World Series of Darts. The tournament featured 16 players (eight PDC players facing eight regional qualifiers) and was being held at the Hisense Arena in Melbourne between 18–20 August 2017.

Phil Taylor is the champion, defeating Peter Wright 11–8 in the final. This would become Phil Taylor's last televised title due to his retirement after the 2018 World Championship.

Prize money
The total prize fund was £60,000.

Qualifiers

The eight invited PDC representatives, sorted according to the World Series Order of Merit, are:

  Gary Anderson (quarter-finals)
  Raymond van Barneveld (first round)
  James Wade (quarter-finals)
  Peter Wright (runner-up)
  Phil Taylor (winner)
  Daryl Gurney (semi-finals)
  Michael Smith (quarter-finals)
  Simon Whitlock (semi-finals)

The regional qualifiers are:

Draw

References 

Melbourne Darts Masters
Melbourne Darts Masters
World Series of Darts
Sports competitions in Melbourne